Nostoc parmelioides is a species of cyanobacterium in the family Nostocaceae. It is notable for its symbiosis with a midge larva, Cricotopus nostocicola.

References 

Nostocaceae
Species described in 1886
Taxa named by Jean-Baptiste Édouard Bornet